Bress is a surname. Notable people with the surname include:

Brian Bress (born 1975), American video artist
Daniel Bress (born 1979), American judge
David G. Bress (1908-1976), American lawyer
Eric Bress, American screenwriter, film director and producer

See also
Bres